The Big Surprise is the debut full-length album by American rock band The Elms. The album was released on May 22, 2001 on Sparrow Records/EMI.

Singles from the album were "Hey Hey" (#4 U.S. CHR) and "Lifeboat" (#11 U.S. CHR). One music video was filmed for the album, for lead single "Hey Hey."  The video premiered on MTV2's "120 Minutes" on May 5, 2002.

The Big Surprise was nominated for two Dove Awards in 2002 in the categories of Best Modern Rock/Alternative Recorded Album and Best Modern Rock/Alternative Recorded Song ("Hey Hey").

Track listing
 Hey, Hey
 Here's My Hand
 Who Got the Meaning?
 The Buzzing Won't Stop!
 A Minute to Ourselves
 The Big Surprise
 Lifeboat
 You Get Me Every Time
 You're Glowing
 Real Men Cry

Recording
Recording sessions for The Big Surprise were conducted throughout 2000 at Ardent Studios in Memphis, Tennessee, and at Treasure Isle Recorders in Nashville, Tennessee.

Personnel

The Elms 
Owen Thomas - vocals, guitar, songwriting
Christopher Thomas - drums, percussion
Thomas Daugherty - guitar
Keith Lee Miller - bass guitar

Additional 
Brent Milligan - producer, bass guitar, keyboards
John Hampton - engineer
Jason Latshaw - engineer
The Love Sponges Quartet - strings
Michael Castille - trumpet
Joe Baldridge - mix engineer
Chuck Zwicky - mix engineer
Richard Dodd - mastering engineer
Kristin Barlowe - photography

References

2001 debut albums
The Elms (band) albums